The women's sprint combination of the 2015–16 ISU Speed Skating World Cup 5, arranged in the Sørmarka Arena in Stavanger, Norway, was contested on 29–31 January 2016. It was the only sprint combination competition of the 2015–16 World Cup.

The contest included each skater's best time from the 500 metres and 1000 metres competitions that were raced during the weekend. Jorien ter Mors of the Netherlands had the best combined result, while Brittany Bowe of the United States came second and Vanessa Bittner of Austria came third.

Results

References

Women sprint combination
5